Parliamentary elections were held in Austria on 22 February 1953. They were the elections in which the Socialist Party received the most votes since 1920.  However, the Austrian People's Party won the most seats. The grand coalition between the two parties was continued with Julius Raab replacing Leopold Figl as Chancellor of Austria, who had had to resign after facing criticism from his own party, and Adolf Schärf of the Socialist Party remaining Vice Chancellor.

Results

References

Elections in Austria
Austria
Legislative
Austrian Parliament